Anas S.p.A. (formerly an acronym for Azienda Nazionale Autonoma delle Strade) is an Italian company deputed to the construction and maintenance of Italian motorways and state highways under the auditing and technical-operative supervision of the Italian Ministry of Sustainable Infrastructures and Mobility (formerly Italian Ministry of Infrastructure and Transport). 

Starting from January 2018, the company is part of Ferrovie dello Stato Italiane.

History
Founded on June 27, 1946, the company took a government grant for the reconstruction of the Italian road network, which had been seriously damaged in World War II.

The managed road network
Anas holds the concession to manage the national road network, as governed by Decreto Legislativo no. 461 of 29 October 1999 as amended by the D.P.C.M. of 21 September 2001 ("Modifications to the Prime Ministerial Decree of 21 February 2000 identifying and transferring, pursuant to Article 101, paragraph 1, of Legislative Decree no. 112 of 1998, roads not included in the national motorway and road network") and other subsequent measures. The company manages and controls a network of  km of state roads, motorways, and spour route under direct management, including motorway interchanges and slip roads. The road network expanded between 2018 and 2021 as a result of the 'Rientro Strade' plan, which brought  km of former highway, regional and county road back under Anas management. The plan was launched in August 2017 with the agreement sanctioned by the Conferenza Unificata, which was followed by the Prime Ministerial Decree of 20 February 2018, while the second phase of the plan started in April 2021 in execution of the D.P.C.M. of 21 November 2019. Anas's roads are divided into regional compartments of competence, of which the Sicilian one has the most extensive road network with over  km.

Shareholdings 

Anas has shareholdings in:

Directly controlled companies
 Anas International Enterprise - 100%
 Anas Concessioni Autostradali - 100%
 Quadrilatero Marche Umbria - 92.38%
 Stretto di Messina S.p.A. (company in liquidation) - 81.85%

Indirectly controlled companies
 PMC Mediterraneum - 1.50%

Associated companies
 Autostrade del Lazio - 50.00%
 Concessioni Autostradali Lombarde - 50.00%
 Concessioni Autostradali Venete - 50.00%
 Autostrada Asti-Cuneo - 35.00%
 Società Italiana per il Traforo del Monte Bianco - 32.13%
 Società Italiana per il Traforo Autostradale del Frejus (Sitaf S.p.A.) - 31.75%

Other companies
 Italian Distribution Council (company in liquidation) - 6.67%
 Consel (Consorzio ELIS per la formazione professionale superiore) - 1.00%

Commercial data

References

External links
Anas Official Website 

Transport companies of Italy
Government-owned companies of Italy
Companies based in Rome
Construction and civil engineering companies established in 1946
Road authorities
Italian companies established in 1946
Construction and civil engineering companies of Italy